Mink oil is an oil used in medical and cosmetic products. It is obtained by the rendering of mink fat which has been removed from pelts destined for the fur industry.

In spite of the term on products labeled “mink oil“, many commercial versions of so-named leather conditioner contain no natural mink oil whatsoever.

Characteristics
Mink oil is a source of palmitoleic acid, which possesses physical properties similar to human sebum. Because of this, mink oil is used in several medical and cosmetic products.  Mink oil is also used for treating, conditioning and preserving nearly any type of leather.

Botanical alternatives to mink oil as a source of palmitoleic acid include macadamia oil  (Macadamia integrifolia) and sea buckthorn oil (Hippophae rhamnoides), both of which contain as much or more palmitoleic acid (17% and 19–29% respectively) than does mink oil (17%).

Mink oil and its fatty acids are unique among animal-derived fats and oils. The unsaturated fatty acids in mink oil account for more than 75% of its fatty acid content, but the oil, nevertheless, has a greater oxidative stability (resistance to rancidity) than other animal or vegetable oils.

See also
 Neatsfoot oil, leather treatment
 Saddle soap, leather cleaning and conditioning
 Antipruritic, as the oil is often an ingredient in insect bite-reliever sticks

References

Animal fat products
Leather